Uncharacterized protein CXorf67 is a protein that in humans is encoded by the CXorf67 gene. The Accession Number for the human gene is NM_203407. Aliases include MGC47837 and LOC340602. The gene is located on the positive strand of the X chromosome at Xp11.22. The mRNA is 1939 base pairs long and contains 1 exon and no introns.

Expression 

Expression of CXorf67 in humans is generally low in all tissues. Higher RNA expression has been reported in the testis and placenta and relatively higher nuclear protein expression has been observed in the placenta, testis and ovarian follicles.

Protein 

The translated human CXorf67 protein is 503 amino acids in length. The protein has a molecular weight of 51.9 kdal and an isoelectric point of 10.432

Interactions 

Protein interaction of CXorf67 with UBC (polyubiquitin-C) in humans was identified using a two-hybrid screening. Currently no other protein interactions have been identified in humans.

Function 

The function of CXorf67 is currently unknown, however the fusion of CXorf67 with the MBTD1 gene has been linked to low-grade endometrial stromal sarcoma in humans. Sequence variants of the chromosomal region Xp11.22 are also predicted to confer susceptibility to prostate cancer in humans.

References

External links
 

Human proteins
Uncharacterized proteins
Genes on human chromosome X